Route 260 is a -long local highway in northwestern New Brunswick, Canada.

Communities along Route 260
 Rang-Douze-Sud
 Rang-Quatorze
 Limerick
 Saint-Martin-de-Restigouche
 Thibault
 Kedgwick

See also
List of New Brunswick provincial highways

References

New Brunswick provincial highways
Roads in Restigouche County, New Brunswick